"Misunderstood" is a song by American rock band Bon Jovi from the album Bounce. Released on December 2, 2002, the song peaked at  34 on Billboards Mainstream Top 40 chart and was nominated for a Grammy Award for Best Pop Performance by a Duo or Group with Vocal. It was featured on the 2003 Brazilian soap opera Mulheres Apaixonadas as a theme of the love couple (Edwiges and Cláudio). The song was a big hit there, making the song a Top 5 hit. The single is a version of the album cut that was remixed by Tim Palmer at Electric Lady Studios in New York.

Music video
The video begins with a girl, Jill (played by Rachel Nichols), opening the door to her room where she and her boyfriend, Jack (played by Tom Sandoval), live. As she enters, she catches both Jack and another woman (played by Camila Alves) naked in bed. Shocked and embarrassed, Jack claims that it isn't what it looks like and begs her to let him explain. The video turns into a flashback and the music begins after an extended instrumental intro. The flashback shows Jack's far-fetched explanation with his dialogue displayed at the bottom of the screen interspersed with footage of Bon Jovi playing the song throughout. Here is Jack's dialogue:

"I was buying you flowers...I slipped and hit my head...I was unconscious...someone stole my wallet...I had amnesia...I wandered aimlessly...I found the pick-pocket...and chased him...into a bad situation! They put me in a box...and dumped me into the river! I floated for hours...finally I landed ashore...I just wanted to go home...but I was mistakenly arrested...and put behind bars. They finally caught the real crook...I ended up outside a secret club...I was front row at a Bon Jovi concert...and my memory came back! I was attacked by dogs...they ripped my clothes off...finally I made it to your bedroom...and just then an earthquake hit...and this girl fell through the ceiling!"

Then the video returns to the present and ends with Jack saying, "And that's exactly how it happened."

The uncut version of the video features different footage of Bon Jovi playing the song, as well as an extended beginning and ending which strongly implies that Jack was cheating on Jill. In the extended beginning, Jack can be heard moaning inside of Jill's room just as she opens the door. This is followed by alternate dialogue from Jill where after Jack tells her that it isn't what it looks like, she expresses her disbelief by asking him how it could possibly be anything else. This is then followed by additional footage where after Jack begs Jill to let him explain, she urges him to do so. Jack pauses for a moment, clearly unsure as to what he's going to say next which suggests that his following story is a complete fabrication. In the extended ending, after Jack finishes speaking, Jill produces a picture of him in their bed with two other women (seemingly engaged in a threesome). She asks him to explain that as well to which Jack nonchalantly says, "You know, there's an even better story for that."

NOTE: The instrumental intro was removed in the uncut version.

Summary

Track listings

Canadian and European CD single
 "Misunderstood" (single remix) (Jon Bon Jovi, Richie Sambora, Andreas Carlsson, Desmond Child)
 "Everyday" (acoustic) (Jovi, Sambora, Carlsson)

Australasian CD single
 "Misunderstood" (single remix) (Jovi, Sambora, Carlsson, Child) – 3:45
 "Everyday" (acoustic) (Jovi, Sambora, Carlsson) – 2:47
 "Undivided" (demo) (Jovi, Sambora, Billy Falcon) – 3:55
 "Celluloid Heroes" (live featuring Ray Davies) (Davies)

European maxi-CD single
 "Misunderstood" (single remix) (Jovi, Sambora, Carlsson, Child)
 "Joey" (demo) (Jovi, Sambora)
 "Right Side of Wrong" (demo) (Jovi)
 "Misunderstood" (live) (Jovi, Sambora, Carlsson, Child)

UK CD1
 "Misunderstood" (single remix) (Jovi, Sambora, Carlsson, Child) – 3:45
 "Everyday" (acoustic) (Jovi, Sambora, Carlsson) – 2:47
 "Undivided" (demo) (Jovi, Sambora, Falcon) – 3:55
 "Misunderstood" (video)

UK CD2
 "Misunderstood" (single remix) (Jovi, Sambora, Carlsson, Child)
 "Celluloid Heroes" (live featuring Ray Davies) (Davies)
 "Joey" (demo) (Jovi, Sambora)

Charts

Release history

References

2002 singles
Bon Jovi songs
Mercury Records singles
Music videos directed by Marc Klasfeld
Songs written by Andreas Carlsson
Songs written by Desmond Child
Songs written by Jon Bon Jovi
Songs written by Richie Sambora